Hauk Buen (11 May 1933 – 1 March 2021) was a Norwegian hardingfele fiddler and fiddle maker.

Buen was born in Kongsberg and was a brother of Knut Buen and Agnes Buen Garnås. Among his albums are Fykerudn from 1992 (in cooperation with his brother Knut), which was awarded Spellemannprisen, and Feledåm from 2000. He was awarded the King's Medal of Merit in gold in 2003.

Buen has inspired and influenced fiddler Annbjørg Lien, who learned several folk tunes from him.

Buen died on 1 March 2020.

References

1933 births
2021 deaths
People from Kongsberg
Norwegian fiddlers
Male violinists
Fiddle makers
Spellemannprisen winners
Recipients of the King's Medal of Merit in gold
21st-century violinists
21st-century Norwegian male musicians